Three ships of the Royal Navy have borne the name HMS Chub, or alternatively HMS Chubb, a name given to several types of fish, many in the family Cyprinidae:

 was a 4-gun  launched in 1807. She capsized in 1812.
HMS Chubb was a schooner on the Great Lakes, the American , which the British captured in 1813. The Americans recaptured her at the Battle of Lake Champlain and sold her in 1815.
 was a  wooden screw gunboat launched in 1855 and broken up by 1869.

References
Citations

Bibliography

Royal Navy ship names